Massilia niabensis is a Gram-negative, aerobic, motile, rod-shaped bacterium  from the genus Massilia and family  Oxalobacteraceae, which was isolated with Massilia niastensis from air samples from Suwon in Korea. Colonies  of M. niabensis are yellowish white.

References

External links
Type strain of Massilia niabensis at BacDive -  the Bacterial Diversity Metadatabase

Burkholderiales
Bacteria described in 2009